Shorea scabrida is a tree in the family Dipterocarpaceae. The specific epithet scabrida means "rough", referring to the indumentum.

Description
The bark is fissured. The inflorescences bear cream flowers, pink at their base.

Distribution and habitat
Shorea scabrida is native to Borneo and Sumatra.

Conservation
Shorea scabrida has been assessed as near threatened on the IUCN Red List. It is threatened by land conversion for agriculture. It is also threatened by logging for its timber, including the construction of logging roads. Mining activities and fires pose additional risks. Shorea scabrida does occur in a number of protected areas.

References

scabrida
Flora of Borneo
Flora of Sumatra
Plants described in 1935